A signature quilt is a quilt that has multiple names signed, stamped, or embroidered on it. While examples exist prior to 1800, the tradition was popularized in the 19th century often as a means of fundraising or given as keepsakes to people moving west. They were also used to commemorate and document historical and communal events, or to indicate affiliations with organizations or groups. They would rarely include signatures of famous people with one unusual specimen created by Adeline Harris Sears containing 350 signatures including those of eight U.S. Presidents.

Signature quilts are considered useful as primary source documents for genealogists and other researchers.

References

Quilting